Litgrid AB is a Lithuanian electricity transmission system operator that operates Lithuania's electricity transmission grid. Litgrid is responsible for the integration of the Lithuanian electricity system into the European electricity infrastructure and the common electricity market.

Litgrid has completed the strategic international connection projects NordBalt (Lithuania-Sweden) and LitPol Link (Lithuania-Poland), and currently it is implementing Lithuania's strategic objective of reorienting its power system for synchronous operation with the continental European power grid. The company has over 300 employees.

As from 2010, the companies shares are listed on the NASDAQ OMX Vilnius stock exchange. 97.5% of Litgrid's shares are owned by EPSO-G UAB which is directly controlled by the Ministry of Energy of the Republic of Lithuania.

History 
The company was founded in 2010, after the reorganisation of the Lithuanian energy sector in accordance with the requirements of the EU's third energy package. The third energy package, approved in the European Union in 2009, stipulates the requirement to separate the transmission and production from grid ownership in the electricity and gas sectors. During 2010–2011, Litgrid took over the ownership and maintenance of the electricity transmission grid from Lietuvos energija (currently – Ignitis group), while the latter company remained the owner of the largest power plants in the country.

As from 1 October 2012, the company is fully separated from the companies that control electricity production, supply and distribution. The company is directly responsible for the implementation of 14 synchronisation projects of special national importance as approved by the Government.

Operations

According to the data of 2021, the company owns 7,000 km of overhead lines, over 200 transformer substations and 17 inter-system lines connecting to other countries, constantly maintaining them to ensure appropriate electricity transmission for all residents, institutions and other organisations in the country. The Lithuanian transmission networks have four 330 kV power line connections with the Latvian, four connections with the Belarusian and three connections with the Russian (Kaliningrad) energy systems.

Synchronisation 
Synchronisation of Lithuania's energy system with the continental European power grid is necessary to ensure the country's energy independence. The power energy systems of the Baltic states are still dependent on the frequency control operations conducted in Russia, but in 2025, the Baltic power systems will join the single synchronous pool of European systems.

On 20 June 2019, in Brussels, a political agreement was signed on the implementation of the synchronisation of the Baltic electricity system with the European grid. The agreement established a specific action plan and key projects to be implemented until 2025, when the Baltic states are to join the secure and reliable European energy system.

The value of the project for the integration of the Baltic and continental European power grids is around 1.6 billion Euros, of which over 1 billion euros are allocated by the European Union.
 
The Baltic synchronisation with the continental European grid requires not only a new connection with Poland, but also the enhancement of internal transmission networks and preparation of the systems for disconnection from the IPS/UPS and for independent frequency control. In 2019, the Lithuanian Government approved a list of 14 synchronisation projects, including the construction of the Harmony Link connection with Poland, expansion of the existing LitPol Link connection by adapting it for synchronous operation, and installation of 3 synchronous compensators. At the end of 2020, were completed 3 projects: the expansion of the Bitėnai substation, completion of a new 110 kV overhead line Pagėgiai-Bitėnai, and reconstruction of the 330 kV power transmission line Elektrėnai Power Plant-Vilnius.

Key projects 

The LitPol Link started its operations in 2015. It was the first connection between the Baltic and Western European electricity infrastructures. This high-capacity connection (400 kV power transmission line) with Poland enables synchronous operation with the energy systems of other European countries and the development of the common European electricity market. Litgrid constructed the LitPol Link in cooperation with the Polish power grid operator PSE. Implementation of this strategic project required an extensive technical design work, while the construction itself was carried out during 2014–2015. In addition, 11 other smaller-scale network projects were completed.

The purpose of the NordBalt project was to lay an inter-system power connection between the Lithuanian and Swedish power transmission systems. The connection's length is around 450 km, while its capacity is 700 MW. This connection is made of underwater and underground high-voltage DC cables and converter stations in Lithuania and Sweden. NordBalt started its operation in 2015. This connection between Lithuania and Sweden ensures more diversity in the supply of electricity, which reduced the price of electricity by 30% in the first year of its operation. Litgrid completed the strategic electricity project in collaboration with the Swedish power transmission system operator Svenska kraftnät.

Harmony Link is  a planned high-voltage direct current (HVDC) connection between Lithuania and Poland. It total length is almost , while its capacity is 700 MW. The connection goes both underwater and underground. It will connect the Żarnowiec substation in the Polish Pomerania region with a newly built 330 kV Darbėnai switching station in the Lithuanian Kretinga region. The Harmony Link project is the first step set out in the political agreement on the synchronisation of the Baltic electricity grids and the continental European grid, signed by the President of the European Commission and the Lithuanian, Latvian, Estonian and Polish heads of state and prime ministers on 28 June 2018. The construction is to be started in 2023, while the commissioning is planned for 2025. The total investment for the Harmony Link project amounts to around 680 million euros, of which €493 million will be allocated as EU support from the Connecting Europe Facility.

The Lithuanian electricity transmission system control and data centre from which Lithuania will control its energy system's frequency as from 2025. Therefore, this site was recognised by the Government as a project of national importance already in 2015. This centre is a strategic project in terms of synchronisation because it is the place where the electricity transmission frequency will be controlled as soon as Lithuania finally disconnects from the IPSU/UPS system. It includes both the physical infrastructure, and the technological solutions to ensure cyber security.

Governance 
As from February 2021, the general manager of the company is Rokas Masiulis. The board consists of:

 Tomas Varneckas – chairman of the board as from 29 December 2022.
 Mindaugas Keizeris – Member of the Board as from 22 December 2022.
 Domas Sidaravičius – Independent Member of the Board as from 20 April 2020.
 Gediminas Karalius – Member of the Board as from 20 April 2022.

References

External links
 

Electric power transmission system operators in Lithuania
Companies listed on Nasdaq Vilnius
Lithuanian companies established in 2010
Companies based in Vilnius
Government-owned companies of Lithuania